Redford is a hamlet in the parish of Carmyllie in Angus, Scotland. It is situated on high ground between Arbroath, on the coast, and the inland county town of Forfar. Carmyllie school is located in the settlement, as was the old Carmyllie railway station.

See also
Carnoustie

References

Villages in Angus, Scotland